Michael Bruno may refer to:
 Michael Bruno (economist) (1932–1996), Israeli economist
 Michael Bruno (entrepreneur), American entrepreneur
 Kalani Das (born Michael Bruno), American percussionist, author and educator
 Michael-Bruno, American architectural design, engineering service and construction management firm